also well known as Honjō Mitsushige was a Japanese samurai and commander of the Sengoku period. He was the castle lord in command of Tateoka castle and Honjō castle.

He was a senior retainer of the Mogami clan and earned highest salary among the samurai of the Mogami clan.

After Mogami clan was demolished by the Tokugawa Shogunate in 1622, he served Sakai Tadayo as a guest samurai. His tomb is at Chōshō-ji Temple in Maebashi.

References

Samurai
1547 births
1639 deaths
Mogami clan
People from Yamagata Prefecture